2013 Regional League Division 2 North-East Region is the 5th season of the League competition since its establishment in 2009. It is in the third tier of the Thai football league system. The league winners and runners up will qualify for the 2013 Regional League Division 2 championship stage.

Changes from Last Season

Team Changes

Promoted Clubs

No club was promoted to the Thai Division 1 League. Last years league champions Roi Et United and runners up Sisaket United failed to qualify from the 2012 Regional League Division 2 championship pool.

Renamed Clubs

 Surin renamed Surin City.
 Ubon Rachathani renamed Ubon UMT

Stadium and locations

League table

References

External links
 Football Association of Thailand

Regional League North-East Division seasons
North